Traveling Circus is the fifth studio album by American country music singer Phil Vassar. It was released on December 15, 2009 as his second album for the Universal South Records label. The album contains the singles "Bobbi with an I" and "Everywhere I Go," both of which have charted on the U.S. country singles charts. Vassar produced the album on his own, and wrote or co-wrote every song on it as well.

Content
The album's first single was "Bobbi with an I," a song about a transvestite man, which peaked at #46 on the Billboard Hot Country Songs charts. Following it was the ballad "Everywhere I Go," which peaked at #36 in late 2009.

Vassar wrote or co-wrote every song on the album, collaborating with Nashville songwriters such as Jeffrey Steele, Craig Wiseman and Tim Nichols, as well as singer Kenny Chesney on the track "I Will Remember You." Vassar produced the album himself, and used his road band on it. His high school art teacher, Jason Erwin, painted the album cover, and a young director named Chris Cella directed the music video for "Everywhere I Go."

The album was originally slated for a February 2010 release, but in November 2009, it was announced that the release date would be moved to December 15, 2009. It is Vassar's second release on the Universal South Records label, following 2008's Prayer of a Common Man.

Critical reception

Album

Stephen Thomas Erlewine of AllMusic gave the album three stars out of five, citing the up-tempo songs as standouts: "Unfortunately, Vassar leans a little too heavily on placid power ballads to give this a truly carnivalesque kick, but when he does take the time to lay back he’s as good as he ever was."

Track listing

Personnel
 Larry Beaird - banjo
 Jason Fausset - keyboards
 Jason Fitz - fiddle, mandolin, strings
 Blair Mingus - handclapping 
 Russ Pahl - six-string bass guitar, banjo, acoustic guitar, electric guitar, steel guitar
 Greg Rausch - handclapping 
 Norb Rausch - handclapping 
 Seth Rausch - drums, handclapping, percussion
 Tim Ryan - acoustic guitar
 Scott Saunders - Hammond B-3 organ, keyboards
 Jeff Smith - acoustic guitar, baritone guitar, electric guitar, background vocals
 Pete Sternberg - bass guitar
 Phil Vassar - piano, lead vocals
 Craig Wiseman - background vocals

Chart performance

References

2009 albums
Phil Vassar albums
Show Dog-Universal Music albums